Cortodera barri is a species of longhorn beetle in the genus Cortodera.

References

Lepturinae